The 1989 Baylor Bears football team represented the Baylor University in the 1989 NCAA Division I-A football season. The Bears finished the season fourth in the Southwest Conference.  In the season's final game, Baylor defeated Texas by the score of 50 to 7.  It was Baylor's seventh victory in Austin and the first there since 1951.

Schedule

Personnel

Season summary

at Texas

Team players drafted into the NFL
The following players were drafted into professional football following the season.

References

Baylor
Baylor Bears football seasons
Baylor Bears football